Derry Cairngorm (Scottish Gaelic: Càrn Gorm an Doire) is a Scottish mountain in the Cairngorms range,  north west of Braemar in the county of Aberdeenshire.

Overview 
Derry Cairngorm is regarded as part of the central group of Cairngorm hills, along with Ben Macdui and Càrn a' Mhàim. Ben Macdui stands four km to the north west and is connected by a col of height of 1014 m. The mountain was originally named An Carn Gorm but was renamed to Carn Gorm an Doire to avoid confusion with the nearby Cairn Gorm. The name has now been anglicised to Derry Cairngorm: the original Gaelic means “Blue cairn of Derry”. Derry is the anglicisation of doire, or doireach, meaning wooded, a reference to the Scots pines that adorn the southern slope of the mountain near Derry Lodge, remnants of the old Caledonian Forest. The hill is well seen from Inverey and often appears as dark blue in colour, however from other angles it takes on a distinct pink tinge as result of its granite rocks (see photo).

Geography 
Derry Cairngorm is a six/seven-kilometre-long ridge-type mountain that runs north to south, it rises from Glen Luibeg in the south and concludes at Coire Etchachan in the north, where it is joined to Beinn Mheadhoin. Coire Etchachan has Loch Etchachan lying within it, at a height of 930 metres the highest notable expanse of water in Great Britain. It has trout living in it. On its eastern flanks the mountain falls steeply and craggily into Glen Derry while its western flanks descend more moderately to the valley of the infant Luibeg Burn. Derry Cairngorm is characterised by large granite boulders on its higher slopes which make walking in the summit area difficult, the walker often having to resort to hopping between boulders. This large expanse of boulders is formed by the action of freezing and thawing in a periglacial environment and is known as a blockfield or felsenmeer. All drainage from the mountain flows south via the Derry and Luibeg burns to join the River Dee, eventually reaching the sea at Aberdeen.

Derry Cairngorm has two subsidiary summits listed in the Munro Tables. Creagan a' Choire Etchachan (1108 m) stands 1.5 km north of the main summit and is a fine viewpoint down into the wild Coire Etchachan. Sgurr an Lochan Uaine (983 m), 1.5 km north east, is seen as just a hump near the cliff edge from the main summit but is more distinct when seen from Glen Derry, which it overlooks. The inclusion of Creagan a' Choire Etchachan as a subsidiary top of Derry Cairgorm is peculiar if one analyses it.  One could say that Ben Macdui has had a top 'stolen' from it. The col connecting it to Derry Cairngorm is at a height of 1014m. whereas the col connecting it to Ben Macdui is 1053m. Most hill list compilers agree that the 'parent' of a subsidiary top is the one it is connected to via the highest col.  In fact this top was classed as a top of Ben Macdui in the Munros tables published up til, and including, 1969. Why it should have been switched to Derry Cairngorm as 'parent' in future editions is an irrational puzzle that only the vagueries of the committees of the Scottish mountaineering Club may be able to answer, among many others about the many highly irrational aspects that still exist within Munro's tables.  Eight hundred metres south of the summit lies an unnamed point with a height of 1040 m. This is the former "top" called Little Cairngorm, which was deleted from the Tops in 1974.

Ascents 

Derry Cairngorm can be climbed from either the east or west sides of the Cairngorm range and either singly or in combination with other hills. The ascent from the east starts at the Linn of Dee car park and takes the track to Derry Lodge (a bicycle can used as far as the lodge). The southern ridge of Derry Cairngorm is then ascended to reach the summit, crossing Little Cairngorm on the way. The mountain can be climbed from the Cairn Gorm ski centre car park and involves climbing and crossing Ben Macdui before continuing to Derry Cairngorm. The Ben Macdui summit plateau can be a hazardous place in mist and bad weather. The ascent from the Linn of Dee can also include climbing Càrn a' Mhàim and Ben Macdui. This is a long hard day's walking of over 30 kilometres, although the use of a bicycle to and from Derry Lodge will help quite a bit. The view from the summit is very good with all the Cairngorm giants looking fine.

See also 
 Ben Nevis
 List of Munro mountains
 Mountains and hills of Scotland

References 

 The Munros Donald Bennett et al.: Scottish Mountaineering Trust: 
  The High Mountains of Britain and Ireland, Irvine Butterfield, 
 Hamish’s Mountain Walk, Hamish Brown, 
 The Magic Of The Munros, Irvine Butterfield, 
Footnotes

Munros
Mountains and hills of the Cairngorms
Mountains and hills of Aberdeenshire
Places and place names on Mar Lodge Estate
One-thousanders of Scotland